This is a list of newspapers currently published in Montserrat.

Weekly
The Montserrat Reporter – Davy Hill
Alliouagana Express – Davy Hill, community news

Official
 Government of Montserrat News

News websites
 ZJB News – Sweeney's
 Montserrat Volcano Observatory – Flemmings
 Discover MNI
 MNI Alive

See also
 List of newspapers

References

Montserrat
Communications in Montserrat
Montserratian culture
Montserrat-related lists